The Six-Principle Baptists is a Baptist Christian denomination in United States.

History
The history of General Six-Principle Baptists in America began in Rhode Island in 1652 when the historic First Baptist Church, once associated with Roger Williams, split. The occasion was the development within the congregation of an Arminian majority who held to the six principles of Hebrew 6:1–2: repentance from dead works, faith toward God, the doctrine of baptisms, the laying-on of hands, resurrection of the dead, and eternal judgment. Of these, the laying-on of hands was the only doctrine really distinctive to this body, and that only because it was advocated as mandatory. This rite was used at the baptism and reception of new members symbolizing the reception of the gifts of the Holy Spirit. Some Calvinistic Baptist churches were also "Six-Principle," but they did not survive as a separate body. Even the influential Philadelphia Baptist Association (org. 1707) added an article concerning laying-on of hands to their 1742 reprint of the 1689 London Baptist Confession. A distinguishing feature of these "General" Six-Principle Baptists was that they would not commune with other Baptists who did not observe the laying-on of hands. In 1656, members left the First Baptist Church in Newport, the church of John Clarke and Obadiah Holmes, and formed a second Six-Principle Baptist Church.

Churches were planted and conferences rose up in Rhode Island, Massachusetts, New York, and Pennsylvania. The Rhode Island Yearly Meeting was formed in 1670, becoming the first Baptist association in America. It was incorporated in 1895 as the General Six-Principle Baptist Conference of Rhode Island. The word "Hope" and the emblem of the anchor (both taken from Hebrews 6) on the flag and Seal of Rhode Island attest to the historical influence of Six-Principle Baptists in that state. The New York Yearly Conference was organized around 1824. After 1865, it became known as the General Six-Principle Baptist Association of Pennsylvania. The Six-Principle Baptists of New England were called "General", distinguishing that they held the general view of Christ's atonement (making salvation possible for all men) rather than the particular view (that he atoned for the elect only).

Six-Principle Baptists also existed in England, probably pre-dating those in America.  The Standard Confession of 1660 specifies the doctrine of laying-on of hands. According to Henry Vedder,

In 1954, the Rhode Island Conference lifted their ban on communing with other Christians, preparing the way for their assimilation into the broader Baptist community. One of the last historical churches to survive is the Stony Lane Six Principle Baptist Church in North Kingstown, Rhode Island. As late as 2009 their pastor, Rev. John Wheeler, wrote "We keep the name only for historical purposes and to our knowledge we are the last church to use it in our official name. We don't include it in our stationary etc., nor do we hold to the specific teaching of highlighting Hebrews 6:1–2 over other parts of Scripture." However, in 2022 they no longer include any mention of "Six Principle" on the church website. According to Albert Wardin, there is also "one church, located in Pennsylvania, which still carries Six Principle in its name, but its current pastor does not observe all the six principles." The Pine Grove Church of Nicholson, Pennsylvania and the Stony Lane Church were the last two churches to be considered historically Six-Principle Baptist.

Reorganization

Saddened by the dissolution of the historic Six-Principle denomination, a small group of Baptist ministers began a reorganization of the movement in 2001. This incorporated reorganization movement was officially renamed on July 10, 2003, as the General Association of Six-Principle Baptist Churches, Inc. It is also known as the General Association of Six-Principle Baptists which is more descriptive of the fact that the General Association includes not only churches, but individuals, ministers, and ministries.

Since its reorganization, the denomination has grown steadily. All of the ministers credentialed by the General Association serve as Missionaries of the General Association. The General Association of Six-Principle Baptist Churches has no direct historical connection to the original body of Six-Principle Baptists.

Beliefs
The "six-principles" adhered to are those listed in :
 Repentance
 Faith
 Baptism
 Laying on of hands
 Resurrection of the dead
 Final judgment

References

Further reading
Annual Reports, Rhode Island Conference
Richard Knight, History of The General or Six Principle Baptists in Europe and America, (Smith and Parmenter, 1827)
A Short History of Baptists, by Henry Vedder
Baptists Around the World, by Albert W. Wardin, Jr.
Dictionary of Baptists in America, Bill J. Leonard, editor
Doing Diversity Baptist Style, by Albert W. Wardin, Jr.
Elder John Gorton and the Six Principle Baptist Church of East Greenwich, Rhode Island, by Cherry Fletcher Bamberg
The Baptist Heritage: Four Centuries of Baptist Witness, by H. Leon McBeth

External links

Denominational Home
Philadelphia Confession of Faith Article 31
The Standard Confession 1660
Rhode Island State Flag
History of The General or Six Principle Baptists in Europe and America by Richard Knight, (Smith and Parmenter, 1827)

Baptist denominations in North America
Arminian denominations